Bátya (Croatian: Baćin or Baćino) is a village in Bács-Kiskun county, Hungary.

Tourism

Cultural sights
Church
World War II monument
Holy Trinity
Calvaria

Other structures
Southwest of Bátya, there is the tallest electricity pylon of Hungary ( height: 138 metres). It is part of Danube crossing from the 400 kV-line Paks - Sandorfalva.

Notable people
 Teri Harangozó (1943 - 2015), singer

Demographics

Existing ethnicities:
  Magyars 
  Croats

Croats from Bátya came to that area in 16th century from Croatian northeastern region of Slavonia. They speak the Štokavian dialect of Croatian, a Slavonian subdialect (Old-Shtokavian with non-reflected yat pronunciation). Similar dialectal features are seen today among population of Gradište near Županja and around Našice.

These Croats belong to special group of Danubian Croats: they call themselves as  Raci. In literature they are also called racki Hrvati.

Bátya Croats' feast is Veliko racko prelo.

Nearby villages
Kalocsa
Fajsz
Foktő
Miske
Dusnok

References

External links
 Official website
 batya6351.atw.hu
 Vendegvaro

Populated places in Bács-Kiskun County